Rosetta: Audio/Visual Original Score is the original score for Justin Jackson's documentary film on the band, Rosetta: Audio/Visual.

Track listing
"Dunes" – 7:24
"Talus" – 1:13
"Stoma" – 2:07
"Tape A" – 3:49
"Lagoons" – 5:21
"Waves" – 8:59
"Alterne" – 3:18
"Estuary" – 4:34
"Bergmann's Rule" – 4:46
"Sedges" – 8:12
"Tape B" – 2:30
"Maritimes" – 4:38

Personnel
 Mike Armine - electronics, samples
 Matt Weed - guitars, bass, tape manipulation
 Linshuang Lu - piano

References

2015 albums
Rosetta (band) albums
Self-released albums